Hypoptopoma is a genus of armored catfishes native to South America.

Taxonomy
The genus was established by Albert C. L. G. Günther in 1868 for his new species Hypoptopoma thoracatum, on the basis of the peculiar, depressed, spatulate formation of the head with the eyes on the lateral edges of the head.

Species
There are currently 15 recognized species in this genus:
 Hypoptopoma baileyi Aquino & Schaefer, 2010
 Hypoptopoma bianale Aquino & Schaefer, 2010
 Hypoptopoma brevirostratum Aquino & Schaefer, 2010
 Hypoptopoma elongatum Aquino & Schaefer, 2010
 Hypoptopoma guianense Boeseman, 1974
 Hypoptopoma gulare Cope, 1878
 Hypoptopoma incognitum Aquino & Schaefer, 2010
 Hypoptopoma inexspectatum (Holmberg, 1893)
 Hypoptopoma joberti (Vaillant, 1880)
 Hypoptopoma machadoi Aquino & Schaefer, 2010
 Hypoptopoma muzuspi Aquino & Schaefer, 2010
 Hypoptopoma psilogaster Fowler, 1915
 Hypoptopoma spectabile (Eigenmann, 1914)
 Hypoptopoma steindachneri Boulenger, 1895
 Hypoptopoma sternoptychum (Schaefer, 1996)
 Hypoptopoma thoracatum Günther, 1868

Distribution
Hypoptopoma species inhabit the drainage basins to the east of the Andes, except for river systems draining to the Atlantic between the mouth of the Amazon River in Brazil and the Paraná River in Argentina.

References

Further reading

Hypoptopomatini
Fish of South America
Catfish genera
Taxa named by Albert Günther
Freshwater fish genera